Derek Austin (11 August 1921 – 22 May 2001) was a librarian and author.

Career

From 1963 to 1967, he was a Subject Editor at the British National Bibliography.  He was also a developer of innovative digital cataloguing systems and the creator of the PRECIS indexing language in 1974, which was used worldwide and for the British National Bibliography.  "His aim was to create an indexing system that would liberate indexers from the constraints of 'relative significance' (main entries).  ...As by-products of his indexing theories he worked out drafts that in the mid-1980s were accepted as British and International Standards for examining documents, and for establishing multilingual and monolingual thesauri".  PRECIS was an example of the application of syntactical devices in indexing. It was replaced at the British National Biography by COMPASS in 1996, which was later replaced by Library of Congress Subject Headings.

After 1974, Austin was head of the Subject System Office, The British Library.

Awards
 1976 Ranganathan Award, from FID/CR and the Documentation Research and Training Centre (Bangalore)
 1978 Margaret Mann Citation, from the American Library Association
 1982 Received his Ph.D. from Sheffield University

Austin was a supernumerary Fellow at Harris Manchester College, University of Oxford.  He was also a member of the Royal Corps of Signals from 1941–1946.

Published works

Reviews of Austin's works

See also
Classification Research Group

References

1921 births
2001 deaths
People educated at Enfield Grammar School
English librarians
British Army personnel of World War II
Royal Corps of Signals soldiers